Gordon Burford (3 August 1919 – 12 March 2010) was an Australian model aircraft engine designer and manufacturer. He was Australia's premier model engine builder. He produced thousands of engines of many different designs including the GeeBee, Sabre, GloChief and Taipan brands. Gordon was also a respected aeromodeler starting with Free Flight at a young age prior to World War II before pioneering in Control line after the war.

After the war ended, importation into Australia of model engines was difficult and expensive due to Australia's remoteness to the rest of the world. Gordon saw an opportunity of manufacturing his own engines for the Australian market. His first engine, produced in 1946, was the Gee Bee, a 5cc diesel motor based on the Sparey 5cc diesel design that had been recently published in England.

What was to follow was a long pedigree of diesel and glow engines from 1cc up to 10cc displacement until Gordon retired in 1974 and handed the business to his son Peter. Gordon then directed his energy into the interest of Australian aeromodelers by taking on the position of Federal Secretary and Treasurer of the Model Aeronautical Association of Australia (MAAA). 
 
Gordon Burford died on 12 March 2010, following a fall at his home in Currumbin Queensland.

Engines Manufactured

Gee Bee 
Gee Bee  Gordon's first engines.

Sabre 
Sabre  was the name Gordon chose for his engines, but was threatened with legal action in 1956 by North American Aviation who built the F-86 Sabre jet. Gordon decided not to use the name anymore, rather than go through a costly legal battle.

Glo Chief 
Glo Chief was then name originally chosen as a replacement for Sabre for the larger Glow plug engines. Gordon later decided to use Taipan for all his engine designs.

Taipan 

Taipan is the brand name that is synonymous with the name Gordon Burford. Hundreds of thousands of these engines were produced and sold worldwide.

Taipan Marine Engines
A line of Taipan diesel and glow marine engines were also produced in various sizes and configurations over the years. These are not detailed here. Details about these and all other Burford engines can be found in the book, Gordon Burford's Model Engines by Maris Dislers.

See also
 Cox model engine

Notes

External links 
More information about Gordon Burford can be found at the following pages:
 Peter Burford Engines
 Model Engine News
 Australian Control Line Nostalgia
 Model Engine Collecting
 Tributes to our Founding Model Engineers

1919 births
2010 deaths
Model aircraft
Model manufacturers of Australia
Model engines